Hirschman or Hirschmann is a German surname, which may refer to:

People

Hirschman
Albert O. Hirschman (1915–2012), German-American economist 
Herbert Hirschman, television producer and director
Isidore Isaac Hirschman, Jr. (1922–1990), American mathematician
Jack Hirschman (born 1933), American poet and social activist

Hirschmann
Carl Anton Wilhelm Hirschmann, Dutch banker and General Secretary of FIFA
Maria Anne Hirschmann, American teacher
Ursula Hirschmann (1913–1991), German anti-fascist activist and an advocate of European federalism

See also
 Herfindahl–Hirschman Index, a measure of the size of firms in relation to the industry and an indicator of the amount of competition among them
 Herschmann, surname
 Hirschman cycle, attempts to describe cycles in American political power
 Hirschman uncertainty, in quantum mechanics, information theory, and Fourier analysis, the entropic uncertainty or Hirschman uncertainty is the sum of the temporal and spectral Shannon entropies
 Hirshman, surname

German-language surnames
Jewish surnames